Vellala is a small village in the state of Andhra Pradesh, India. It is near the town of Proddutur in the Kadapa District.
The village got its name from the locally famous "Vellala Sanjevaraswami ", a temple dedicated to Lord Hanuman.
This temple is at the place where Lord Hanuman stopped for some water while flying to Lanka carrying the Sanjivani mountain.

Also see about

References 

Villages in Kadapa district